The Lawton Braves was the final and primary name of the  minor league baseball teams based in Lawton, Oklahoma from 1947 to 1957. Lawton played as a member of the Texas-Oklahoma League in 1911 and the Sooner State League from 1947 to 1957, winning league championships in 1949, 1954 and 1955. Lawton hosted home games at Koehler Park in 1911 and all others at Memorial Park. 

Lawton was a minor league affiliate of the Milwaukee Braves (1954–1957), Cincinnati Reds (1952–1953) and New York Giants (1947–1951).

Baseball Hall of Fame member Travis Jackson managed the Lawton Braves from 1954 to 1957.

History
Lawton first had minor league baseball in 1911, when the city briefly hosted a team in the Texas-Oklahoma League. The Lawton Medicine Men had a 17–31 record when the Lawton franchise folded on June 14, 1911.

Lawton next played in the Class D level Sooner State League from 1947 to 1957. Lawton teams played as affiliates of the Milwaukee Braves (1954–1957), Cincinnati Reds (1952–1953) and New York Giants (1947–1951). Lawton took the moniker of their affiliates in each case. Lawton won Kansas-Oklahoma-Missouri League championships in 1949, 1954 and 1955. The 1954 and 1955 Lawton Braves championship teams were managed by Baseball Hall of Fame inductee Travis Jackson. The Sooner State League folded after the 1957 season.

The ballparks
The 1947 to 1957 Lawton teams played home games at Memorial Park. The ballpark was located at 17th and G Streets, S.W., in the area that is now called Ahlschlager Park. The ballpark had a capacity of 3,600 (1947) and 2,000 (1953). Over their final four seasons, Lawton's season attendance had dropped from 47,000 in 1954 to 15,000 by 1957.

In 1911, Lawton played at home games atKoehler Park. Koehler Park was located between S.W. A and C Avenues on the north and south and S.W. 14th and 15th Streets on the east and west in Lawton, Oklahoma.

Timeline

Season-by-season

Notable alumni

Baseball Hall of Fame alumni
 Travis Jackson (1954–1957, MGR) Inducted, 1982

Notable alumni
 Ed Albrecht (1947)
 Marv Blaylock (1948)
 Louis Brower (1947–1950, Player/MGR)
 Bob Harrison (1948-1949)
 Bobby Knoop (1957) MLB All-Star; Angels Hall of Fame
 Ron Piche (1955)
 Charlie Rabe (1952)
Ron Samford (1948)

See also
Lawton Giants playersLawton Reds players

References

Baseball teams established in 1954
Sports clubs disestablished in 1957
Atlanta Braves minor league affiliates
1954 establishments in Oklahoma
1957 disestablishments in Oklahoma
Defunct minor league baseball teams
Professional baseball teams in Oklahoma
Lawton, Oklahoma
Defunct baseball teams in Oklahoma
Baseball teams disestablished in 1957